See the Morning is the fourth studio album  by Chris Tomlin released on September 26, 2006. The title comes from that idea that "our God is as faithful as the rising sun" and is the "Light of the World". The album was originally released in two versions: one with 11 tracks, the other with 4 alternate versions of his songs (including acoustic and demo versions) and a special behind-the-scenes look at the recording of the album. Since then, another version, the tour edition, has been released, which features the standard version, along with music/live videos, along with a sermon by Louie Giglio titled "How Great Is Our God". The first single from the album was "Made to Worship", which was first heard as an iTunes bonus track for the Passion album Everything Glorious.

Commercial response 

See the Morning debuted at No. 15 on the Billboard 200. Combined with a No. 1 debut on the SoundScan compiled Current Contemporary Christian, Christian Retail and Billboard Christian Album sales charts with 47,420 units sold, the CD experienced a 113% sales leap over Arrivings first-week numbers (that album went on to be Platinum-certified). The album has sold 116,000 copies as of June 2007 and was certified Gold by the RIAA in January 2008.

 Track listing 

 Singles 

 "Made to Worship" (2006)
 "How Can I Keep From Singing?" (2007)
 "Amazing Grace (My Chains Are Gone)" (2007)

 Personnel 

 Chris Tomlin – vocals, acoustic piano, acoustic guitar
 Matt Gilder – keyboards
 Ben Shive – keyboards
 Daniel Carson – electric guitar
 Ed Cash – acoustic guitar, electric guitar, backing vocals
 Paul Moak – electric guitar
 Jesse Reeves – bass
 Travis Nunn – drums
 Ken Lewis – percussionProduction'

 Ed Cash – producer, engineer, mixing at Ed's, Franklin, Tennessee
 Louie Giglio – executive producer
 Brad O'Donnell – executive producer
 Stephan Sharp – assistant engineer
 Jacquire King – mix assistant
 Stephen Marcussen – mastering at Marcussen Mastering, Hollywood, California
 Jess Chambers – A&R administration
 Holly Meyers – A&R administration
 Allen Clark – photography
 Jan Cook – creative direction
 Tim Frank – director of photography
 Pixel Peach Studio – package design

Awards 

In 2007, the album won two Dove Awards for Praise & Worship Album of the Year and Pop/Contemporary Album of the Year at the 38th GMA Dove Awards. The song "Made to Worship" also received two nominations.

References

2006 albums
Chris Tomlin albums